Gibbs Lake is a lake located in Rock County, Wisconsin, United States.

Gibbs Lake is a fishing, swimming, and picnicking destination. Visitors can gain access to the lake via Gibbs Lake Park. The park is located approximately 12 miles northwest from the center of Janesville.

References

Lakes of Rock County, Wisconsin